Central Vermont No. 220 is a preserved rail locomotive inside an exhibition building at Shelburne Museum in Shelburne, Vermont.

Background

In 1915, the American Locomotive Company of Schenectady, New York, built No. 220, the last coal-burning, ten-wheeler steam engine used on the Central Vermont Railway. Because it possessed a medium-sized 4-6-0 engine (4 leading wheels, 6 driving wheels, and 0 trailing small wheels), the No. 220 served double duty pulling both freight and passenger trains. No. 220 became known as the "Locomotive of the Presidents", because of its use on special trains carrying Calvin Coolidge, Herbert Hoover, Franklin D. Roosevelt, and Dwight D. Eisenhower.

The steam engine persisted as the only type of locomotive operating in the United States until the introduction of the electric train in 1895 and, even then, steam engines continued to dominate the rails until the 1950s when diesel came into wide use. The inscription "28%" on the coal tender indicates that the engine had the potential to lift or drag up to twenty-eight thousand pounds of dead weight. The Central Vermont Railway retired No. 220 from service in 1955 and presented it to the Shelburne Museum for preservation. The museum built the surrounding shed soon afterward to protect the locomotive and the private car (Grand Isle) from the elements.

See also
Shelburne Railroad Station and Freight Shed

References

Shelburne Museum. 1993. Shelburne Museum: A Guide to the Collections. Shelburne: Shelburne Museum, Inc.

Shelburne Museum
Museums established in 1947
Railroad museums in Vermont
Rail transportation in Vermont
1947 establishments in Vermont
Central Vermont Railway
Individual locomotives of the United States
Preserved steam locomotives of Vermont
ALCO locomotives